Khizra Rasheed (born 24 February 1988) is a Pakistani badminton player. She was the bronze medalist at the 2016 South Asian Games in the women's doubles event, and the champion at the 2017 Pakistan International tournament.

Achievements

South Asian Games 
Women's doubles

BWF International Challenge/Series 
Women's doubles

  BWF International Challenge tournament
  BWF International Series tournament
  BWF Future Series tournament

References

External links 
 

Living people
1988 births
Pakistani female badminton players
South Asian Games bronze medalists for Pakistan
South Asian Games medalists in badminton